The Gulfstream V (Model GV, pronounced "G-five") is a long-range, large business jet aircraft produced by Gulfstream Aerospace, derived from the previous Gulfstream IV. It typically accommodates four crew and 14 passengers. It first flew on November 28, 1995, and entered service in June 1997. It is used by the US military under the designation C-37A. It is followed by an improved version, the Gulfstream 550 (Model GV-SP).

Development

In the early 1990s, the Gulfstream V (GV) was developed as a response to the Bombardier Global Express.
It was certified on April 11, 1997.
Total production of the Gulfstream V was 193 aircraft.
By 2018, 1997-1999 Gulfstream GVs were trading at $8.8-10.25 million.
By 2019, a GV was worth around $10 million: below $6 million for a fixer to p $13 million for a late model low-time aircraft.

Design
Compared to the Gulfstream IV, the engines are changed from Rolls-Royce Tay to Rolls-Royce BR700-710A1-10 with increased thrust, higher bypass ratio, and Full Authority Digital Engine Controls (FADEC). It has thrust reversers and composite flight control surfaces. Maximum takeoff and landing weights are increased by 15%.

It has a new semi supercritical wing for a fuel capacity of  more than the G-IV.
The three zone cabin is similar to the G-IV, smaller than the Global Express, while its dispatch reliability, cabin noise and fuel efficiency compare favourably against its competitors of the same era.
Compared to the comparably priced Global Express, the GV offers more range and is more fuel efficient while the Bombardier offers better runway performance, a larger cabin and a softer ride.
BR710 overhaul comes at 8,000 hour or 10 years if it comes earlier and costs $1.25 million per engine.

Variants

G-V
Production aircraft powered by two BMW-Rolls-Royce 700-710A1-10 engines.
C-37A
United States military designation for the G-V aircraft.
C-20C

Operators

Civil operators
The majority of G-Vs are operated by corporate and individual owners. Mark Cuban paid $40 million for a Gulfstream V in October 1999, earning a Guinness Record of "largest single e-commerce transaction". Steve Jobs received a Gulfstream V as compensation from Apple in 2000.

Government and military operators

 Algerian Air Force operates the Gulfstream V for VIP transport

 Hellenic Air Force operates one Gulfstream V for VIP transport.

 A Special Electronic Mission Aircraft (SEMA), based on a highly modified Gulfstream G-V aircraft, was delivered to the Israeli Ministry of Defense in June 2005.

 Italian Air Force operates two G550-based AEW&C systems (IAI EL/W-2085). The first aircraft was delivered on 19 December 2016. The second aircraft was delivered on 23 January 2018.

 Singapore Air Force operates four G550-based AEW&C systems (IAI EL/W-2085).

 Japan Coast Guard received the sole C-37A on January 17, 2005. Dubbed "Umi Washi" (Sea Eagle), the aircraft will be operated by the JCG for maritime surveillance search and rescue. The second aircraft was delivered in mid-2005.

 The State of Kuwait operates a G-V aircraft in a transport role for the Royal family.

 Saudi Arabia operates two GVs in a medevac configuration.

The 89th Airlift Wing's 99th Airlift Squadron, Andrews Air Force Base, Maryland, operates four C-37As. The 6th Air Mobility Wing's 310th Airlift Squadron, MacDill Air Force Base, Florida operates three C-37As. The 15th Airlift Wing's 65th Airlift Squadron, Hickam Air Force Base, Hawaii operates one C-37A. The 86th Airlift Wing's 76th Airlift Squadron, Ramstein Air Base, Germany has two C-37As. The Executive Transport Detachment Pacific, Hickam Air Force Base, Hawaii operates one C-37A. The United States Army Priority Air Transport Det. (USAPAT), Andrews AFB, MD, operates two C-37As.

On March 11, 2005, Gulfstream delivered an ultra-long-range G-V to the National Center for Atmospheric Research (NCAR). The aircraft—known as the High-performance, Instrumented Airborne Platform for Environmental Research (HIAPER), based in Boulder, Colorado, is being used by environmental and atmospheric scientists from both public and private research facilities. The GV was chosen by NCAR for its exceptionally high cruising altitude, long range, endurance, payload, reliability, and low operating costs, as well as worldwide product support. The HIAPER Gulfstream V is modified to accept wing/pylon mounted instrumentation.
 United States Air Force operates the C-37A as command/executive transport
 United States Army operates the C-37A as command/executive transport
 United States Marine Corps operates the C-37A as command/executive transport
 United States Navy operates the C-37A as command/executive transport
 United States Coast Guard operates one C-37A for executive transportation of the Secretary of Homeland Security and the Coast Guard Commandant as of January 2012.
 Federal Aviation Administration operates one Gulfstream G-IV with tail number N1.
 Federal Bureau of Investigation & Department of Justice operate one Gulfstream G-V.
 Federal Emergency Management Agency operates one Gulfstream G-V for team transport in disaster response.
 National Center for Atmospheric Research operates one Gulfstream G-V for scientific research.
 The National Aeronautics and Space Administration operates one Gulfstream G-V (N95NA) at the Lyndon B. Johnson Space Center which takes part in research flights as well as to transport NASA astronauts returning from the International Space Station back to the JSC in Houston upon their landing in Kazakhstan.

Specifications

See also

References

External links

 

Gulfstream aircraft
1990s United States business aircraft
1990s United States military transport aircraft
Twinjets
T-tail aircraft
Aircraft first flown in 1995
Low-wing aircraft